The Massry Prize was established in 1996, and until 2009 was administered by the Meira and Shaul G. Massry Foundation.  The Prize, of $40,000 and the Massry Lectureship, is bestowed upon scientists who have made substantial recent contributions in the biomedical sciences.  Shaul G. Massry, M.D., who established the Massry Foundation, is Professor Emeritus of Medicine and Physiology and Biophysics at the Keck School of Medicine, University of Southern California.  He served as Chief of its Division of Nephrology from 1974 to 2000.  In 2009 the KECK School of Medicine was asked to administer the Prize, and has done so since that time.  Ten winners of the Massry Prize have gone on to be awarded a Nobel Prize.

Previous laureates
Source: KECK School of Medicine
 1996 Michael Berridge in the field of Signal Transduction
 1997 Judah Folkman in the field of Growth Factors
 1998 Mark Ptashne in the field of Regulation of Transcription
 1999 Gunter Blobel in the field of Protein Trafficking. Blobel received the 1999 Nobel Prize in Physiology and Medicine two months after his receipt of the Massry Prize.
 2000 Leland H. Hartwell in the field of Cell Cycle. Hartwell won the 2001 Nobel Prize in Physiology and Medicine one year after he received the Massry Prize.
 2001 Avram Hershko and  Alexander Varshavsky in the field of Proteolysis and the Ubiquitin System.  Hershko won the 2004 Nobel Prize in Chemistry three years after he won the Massry Prize.
 2002 Mario Capecchi and  Oliver Smithies for their pioneering work on Gene targeting. They received the 2007 Nobel Prize in Physiology and Medicine five years after they won the Massry Prize.
 2003 Roger Kornberg,  David Allis and  Michael Grunstein in the field of Nuclear Chromatin. Kornberg won the 2006 Nobel Prize in Chemistry three years after he received the Massry Prize.
 2004 Ada Yonath and  Harry Nolla in the field of Ribosomal Structure. Yonath won the 2009 Nobel Prize in Chemistry five years after she received the Massry Prize.
 2005 Andrew Fire,  Craig Mello and  David Baulcombe in the field of RNAi. Fire and  Mello won the 2006 Nobel Prize in Physiology and Medicine one year after they received the Massry Prize.
 2006 Akira Endo in the field of Novel Therapies specifically for the Discovery of Statins
 2007 Michael Phelps for the development of the PET Scan and its Clinical Application
 2008 Shinya Yamanaka,  James A. Thomson, and  Rudolf Jaenisch for their work in the field of Induced Pluripotent Stem Cells  Shinya Yamanaka received the 2012 Nobel Prize in Physiology and Medicine
 2009 Gary Ruvkun and  Victor Ambros for their work in the field of Micro RNA
 2010 Randy Schekman for his work regarding the molecular mechanism of defects in secretion that lead to human diseases of development such as spina bifida. He received 2013 Nobel in Physiology and Medicine. 
 2011 Franz-Ulrich Hartl and  Arthur Horwich for work on Chaperone-assisted protein folding
 2012 Michael Rosbash, Jeffrey C. Hall and Michael W. Young for their groundbreaking studies of the molecular basis of circadian rhythms. They received the Nobel Prize in Physiology or Medicine in 2017.
 2013 Michael Sheetz,  James A. Spudich and  Ronald D. Vale for their work defining molecular mechanisms of intracellular motility
 2014 Steven Rosenberg, Zelig Eshhar and James P. Allison for their research on T cells.
 2015 Philippe Horvath, Jennifer Doudna and Emmanuelle Charpentier for their research on gene editing.
 2016 Gero Miesenböck, Peter Hegemann, Karl Deisseroth for their research on optogenetics.
 2017 Rob Knight, Jeffrey Gordon, Norman R. Pace for their discovery of the microbiomes.
 2018 Gregg Semenza, William Kaelin Jr., Peter J. Ratcliffe
 2019 Ryszard Kole, Stanley T. Crooke for their seminal work in the development of oligonucleotides targeting messenger RNA as novel therapeutics for a wide range human diseases.
 2021 Svante Pääbo, David Reich, Liran Carmel

See also

 List of biomedical science awards

References

Biomedical awards
Academic awards